Backstabber may refer to:

 Back Stabbers (album), a 1972 album by The O'Jays
 "Back Stabbers" (song), the title track from the album
 "Backstabber" (The Dresden Dolls song), a 2006 song by The Dresden Dolls
 "Backstabber" (Spunge song), a 2005 single by UK ska punk group Spunge
 "Backstabber", the first official single released by Ripchord
 "Backstabber", a song by Disciple from their 2005 album Disciple
 "Backstabber", a song by Eminem from his album Infinite
 "Backstabber", a song by Kesha from her debut album Animal
 "Backstabber", a song by Krokus from their 1999 album Round 13

See also 
 "Backstabbers" (CSI: Miami episode)
 Backstabbers Incorporated, an American hardcore/metal band